The European Figure Skating Championships is an annual figure skating competition in which figure skaters compete for the title of European champion. Medals are awarded in the disciplines of men's singles, women's singles, pair skating, and ice dance. The event is sanctioned by the International Skating Union (ISU) and is the sport's oldest competition. The first European Championships was held in 1891 in Hamburg, Germany and featured one segment, compulsory figures, with seven competitors, all men from Germany and Austria. It has been, other than five periods, held continuously since 1891, and has been sanctioned by the ISU since 1893. Women were allowed to compete for the first time in 1930, which is also the first time pairs skating was added to the competition. Ice dance was added in 1954. Only eligible skaters from ISU member countries in Europe can compete, and skaters must have reached at least the age of 15 before July 1 preceding the competition. ISU member countries can submit 1-3 skaters to compete in the European Championships.

History 
Although they have not been held continuously, the European Championships is figure skating's oldest championship. The first European Championships were held in 1891 in Hamburg, Germany. It featured one segment, compulsory figures, with seven competitors, five from Germany and two from Austria. The event was sponsored by the Austrian and German skating federations, after they combined to become one federation. All the medalists were from Germany; Oskar Uhlig won the first gold medal, Anon Schmitson came in second place, and Franz Zilly was third. The second European Championships were held in Vienna in 1892. The event had ten competitors: one from Hungary, two from Germany, and seven from Austria. It included two segments, compulsory figures and free skating. It was also sponsored by the German/Austrian federation. Austrian Eduard Englemann won the gold medal, Hungarian Tibor von Földváry came in second place, and Georg Zachariades from Austria was third.

The next European Championships was held in 1893 in Berlin; it was the first time the event was under the jurisdiction of the International Skating Union (ISU), which was formed in the summer of 1892. The championships were sponsored by the Berlin Skating Club, and like the previous two years, was organized by the German/Austrian federation. There were eight competitors: three from Austria, two from Germany, and one each from Hungary, Sweden, and Norway. Englemann is listed as the gold medalist; Henning Grenander from Sweden came in second, and Zachariades came in third. Figure skating historian James Hines called the 1893 European Championships "clearly a success from a skating standpoint", but it also marked figure skating's "first major controversy", due to "different interpretations of the scoring rules, which could result in a tie depending upon one's interpretation of them". The Berlin Skating Club declared Grenander the winner, but the ISU declared Englemann the winner. The problem was never resolved, but in 1895, the ISU declared the 1893 results invalid. ISU historian Benjamin T. Wright said that the controversy "nearly led to the demise" of the newly formed ISU.

The next two European Championships, 1894 and 1895, "experienced a marked decrease in participation, perhaps a result of the scoring debacle". In 1894, five skaters competed in Vienna. Engelmann won his third Europeans gold medal, Austrian Gustav Hügel came in second, and Földváry came in third. In 1895, which was held in Budapest, three skaters competed, with one withdrawal. Földváry won the gold medal, Hügel again came in second, and Gilbert Fuchs from Germany came in third. There were no European Championships for two years, which Hines speculated was because of the small number of contestants in 1894 and 1895, although the competition returned in 1898. Hines also reported that the European Championships were again interrupted in 1902 and 1903, "for lack of ice". By the beginning of World War I, 20 European Championships were held. There were three more interruptions of the European Championships: between 1915 and 1922 due to World War I, between 1940 and 1946 due to World War II, and in 2021, due to the COVID-19 pandemic.

Figure skating historian James Hines reported that "perhaps the most bizarre incident in the history of competitive figure skating occurred at the 1930 European Figure Skating Championships in Slovakia". The competition's referee was not certified by the ISU and the Yugoslavian judge "was a replacement who served falsely" under the name of a judge who was certified. The irregularities were discovered after the competition was over, so the ISU nullified the results and ordered the competition reskated. The winner of the original competition, Joseph Silva from Czechoslovakia, was not able to compete in the second competition. Karl Schäfer from Austria won the reskate and is listed as the gold medalist.

Only men competed at the European Championships until 1930, which is when women single skaters and pair skating were added. All members of the ISU, not just skaters from Europe, were allowed to compete at Europeans until 1948. Ice dance was added to Europeans in 1954. The first time the Soviet Union sent skaters to the European Championships was in 1956. Competitions were held in outdoor rinks until 1967 when the ISU ruled that both the European and World Championships be held in covered ice rinks.

Qualifying
Only those competitors who are "members of a European ISU Member" are eligible to compete in the European Championships. According to the ISU's Constitution, in order to be eligible to compete in international senior competitions, ISU senior championships, and the Olympics, skaters must have "reached at least the age of fifteen (15) before July 1 preceding the Events". Each ISU member country can send at least one competitor per discipline and a maximum of three competitors per discipline, if they earn the minimum total element scores, which is determined and published each season by the ISU, during the current or during the immediately previous season. Skaters who earn the minimum elements score/points during the Olympic season or during the immediately previous season, as established for the European and Four Continents championships, are eligible to compete in the Olympics.

The number of additional competitors eligible to compete from ISU member countries is determined by the accumulation of points "equal to the sum of placements of their Competitors who were entered in this preceding season’s Championships". Single skaters who do not qualify for the free skating program after being entered in the short program receive 18 points towards the entry quota. Pairs teams and ice dancers who enter the short program or rhythm dance but do not qualify for the free skate or free dance receive the number of points equal to their placement in the short program and rhythm dance. Skaters who move forward to the free skate or free dance, but do not place higher than 16th place, are awarded 16 points. Skaters who withdraw from the competition and were not able to complete the free skate or free dance, but who were in the top 10 in the short program or rhythm dance, are not considered for the entry quota. If an ISU member country sends three competitors to a competition, only the two best-scoring skaters and teams will count for points. Each member country of the ISU, for each discipline, can enter one substitute per entry "only if their ISU Members have withdrawn the name of their Competitors initially entered for the concerned discipline at least one hour before the first draw".

The number of competitors, or the overall entry quota, per discipline an ISU member country can send to a competition "is determined in accordance" with the chart below.

Medalists

Men

Women

Pairs

Ice dance

Cumulative medal count

Footnotes

References

Works cited
 Hines, James R. (2011). Historical Dictionary of Figure Skating. Lanham, Maryland: Scarecrow Press. .
 Hines, James R. (2015). Figure Skating in the Formative Years: Singles, Pairs, and the Expanding Role of Women. Urbana, Illinois: University of Illinois Press. .
 
 "Special Regulations & Technical Rules Single & Pair Skating and Ice Dance 2022" (S&P/ID 2022). International Skating Union. Retrieved 14 November 2022.

External links

 International Skating Union

 
Figure skating competitions
European championships
Figure skating in Europe
Recurring sporting events established in 1891